Nadine de Rothschild (née Nadine Nelly Jeannette Lhopitalier; born 18 April 1932) is a French author and former actress. She is the widow of banker Edmond Adolphe de Rothschild, a member of the Rothschild family.

Biography 
Nadine Lhopitalier was born in Saint-Quentin, Aisne, France. She never met her father. At 14 years-old, she left her mother's house and worked in a Peugeot factory. 

2 years later, at 16, she became the model of the painter Jean-Gabriel Domergue, a socialite who opened the door for her to the worlds of theater and film. In 1952, she began her acting career under the pseudonym of Nadine Tallier and played various roles from 1952 to 1964. 

In 1958, she started a romantic relationship with the son of Clement Callingham and Norah Docker. 

In 1962, two years before ending her career in film, she married Edmond Adolphe de Rothschild of the French branch of the Rothschild family.  At the time, Edmond was chairman and principal owner of the Edmond de Rothschild Group, a private banking group headquartered in Geneva, Switzerland. Although she was raised Roman Catholic, she converted to Judaism stating: "It would not have been possible to have the name Rothschild and be a Catholic... Nor would it be right for the son of a Rothschild to be half-Jewish and half-Catholic."  They had one son born in 1963, Benjamin de Rothschild (1963-2021), shortly after their marriage. Following her husband's death in 1997, David Rockefeller proposed to her but she refused.

Lhopitalier used the noble title of her husband (Baroness), issued to the Rothschild family under the Second French Empire. She wrote a book about manners (Le Bonheur de Séduire l'Art de Réussir) and her autobiography (La baronne rentre à cinq heures). In addition, Lhopitalier provided some reviews in the press on the same subject. In 2004, she opened the Nadine de Rothschild International Way of Life Academy in Geneva, Switzerland.

In 2014, she held 17% of the holding's capital and 7% of the voting rights of Edmond de Rothschild Group. In disagreement with her daughter-in-law Ariane de Rothschild, she transferred her share of the family fortune to the Swiss private bank Pictet in 2014 and 2019.

Filmography 

 1949 : Un chien et madame by Marcel Martin (réalisateur) - court métrage (19mn) -
 1949 : Mission à Tanger by André Hunebelle - Une jeune femme dans la cabaret
 1949 : Au royaume des cieux by Julien Duvivier - Une collégienne
 1950 : Quai de Grenelle by Emile-Edwin Reinert - Une danseuse nue dans la boite de nuit
 1951 : Caroline chérie by Richard Pottier – Non créditée au générique (doublure de Martine Carol)
 1951 : Nez de cuir by Marc Allégret
 1951 : Le passage de Vénus by Maurice Gleize - Gisèle
 1951 : The Sleepwalker by Maurice Labro – Uncredited - Ginette, une vendeuse des magasins Berthès
 1952 : Ouvert contre X by Richard Pottier - Amélie, la soubrette
 1952 : Manina, la fille sans voiles by Willy Rozier - Mathilda
 1952 : Coiffeur pour dames by Jean Boyer - Mlle Mado
 1953 :  Women of Paris by Jean Boyer - Poupette
 1953 : Children of Love by Léonide Moguy - Lulu
 1953 : Une vie de garçon by Jean Boyer
 1954 : Si Versailles m'était conté... by Sacha Guitry – uncredited - Une dame de la cour
 1954 : Ma petite folie by Maurice Labro - Suzanne
 1954 : Les hommes ne pensent qu'à ça by Yves Robert - La jeune femme dans sa baignoire
 1954 : Les impures by Pierre Chevalier - Une entraîneuse
 1954 : Madame du Barry by Christian-Jaque - Loque, une fille du roi
 1955 : Chantage by Guy Lefranc - Janine, la photographe
 1956 : Les Truands by Carlo Rim
 1956 : Vous pigez by Pierre Chevalier - Amanda
 1956 : Ce soir les jupons volent by Dimitri Kirsanoff - Tania
 1956 : Fernand cow-boy by Guy Lefranc - Any, la chanteuse du saloon
 1956 : En effeuillant la marguerite by Marc Allégret - magali, une journaliste
 1956 : Folies-Bergère ou Un soir au music-hall by Henri Decoin - Sonia
 1956 : Le long des trottoirs by Léonide Moguy - Une pensionnaire
 1956 : L'Homme et l'Enfant by Raoul André - Pitel
 1956 : Notre-Dame de Paris by Jean Delannoy - Une fille à la cour des miracles
 1957 : Cinq Millions comptant by André Berthomieu - Céleste
 1957 : Miss Catastrophe by Dimitri Kirsanoff - Arlette
 1957 : Donnez-moi ma chance ou Piège à filles de Léonide Moguy - Kiki
 1957 : Comme un cheveu sur la soupe by Maurice Regamey - Juliette, une entraîneuse
 1958 : Girls at Sea by Gilbert Gunn - Antoinette (British film) 
 1958 : En bordée by Pierre Chevalier - Muguette
 1958 : The Possessors by Denys de La Patellière - Sylviane, la jeune actrice entretenue
 1959 : Cigarettes, Whiskey and Wild Women by Maurice Regamey - Arlette, la "pépée" qui aime le whisky
 1959 : Rue de la peur (Los Cobardes) by Juan Carlos Thorry - Maria
 1959 : Visa pour l'enfer by Alfred Rode - Clémentine
 1959 : The Treasure of San Teresa (autres titres : Hot Money Girl ou Long Distance) - Larry agent secret by Alvin Rakoff - Zizi
 1961 : Deuxième Bureau contre terroristes by Jean Stelli - Claire
 1964 : Une ravissante idiote by Édouard Molinaro

Theatre 
 1952 : Schnock opérette de Marc-Cab et Jean Rigaux, mise en scène Alfred Pasquali, Théâtre des Célestins
 1954 : Les chansons de Bilitis opérette de Jean Valmy et Marc Cab d'après Pierre Louys, music by Joseph Kosma, Théâtre des Capucines

Works as a writer
 La Baronne rentre à cinq heure (avec la collaboration de Guillemette de Sairigné), Paris : Jean-Claude Lattès, 1984. 255 p. + 16 f. de planches.
 Heureuse et pas fâchée de l'être, autobiographie, Paris : Éditions de la Seine, coll. « Succès du livre », 1987. 221 p. + 16 p. de planches
 Parlez-moi d'amour, Paris : Fixot, 1989. 243 p. + 8 p. de planches
 Natara, roman, Paris : Fixot, 1994. 343 p.
 Femme un jour, femme toujours (savoir-vivre), Paris : Fixot, 1997. 284 p. + 8 p. de planches
 L'amour est affaire de femmes, Paris : Robert Laffont, 2001. 285 p. + 16 p. de planches
 Le bonheur de séduire, l'art de réussir : le savoir-vivre du XXIe siècle, Paris : Robert Laffont, 2001. 436 p. + 8 p. de planches. Édition revue et augmentée d'un ouvrage paru en 1991 sous le titre « Le bonheur de séduire, l'art de réussir : savoir vivre aujourd'hui ».
 Jours heureux à Quiberon, Neuilly-sur-Seine : Michel Lafon, 2002. 160 p..
 Sur les chemins de l'amour, Paris : Robert Laffont, 2003. 327 p. + 16 p. de planches.
 Megève, un roman d'amour, Paris : Albin Michel, 2004. 299 p. + 8 p. de planches.
 Les hommes de ma vie, Paris : Albin Michel, 2007
 Bonnes manières, 2009
 Réussir l'éducation de nos enfants, avec Arsène Bouakira, Lausanne-Paris : Favre, 2009
 Ma philosophie... d'un boudoir à l'autre'', Paris : Albin Michel, 2010

See also 
 Rothschild family

References

External links 

1932 births
Living people
Nadine de Rothschild
20th-century French writers
French film actresses
Converts to Judaism from Roman Catholicism
20th-century French Jews
Austrian baronesses
20th-century French actresses
Edmond Adolphe de Rothschild